Gary Paul Wraight (born 5 March 1979) is a former professional footballer who played as a midfielder.

Career
Wraight began his career with Wycombe Wanderers. At Wycombe, Wraight made seven Football League appearances after progressing from the club's academy. Following his time at Wycombe, Wraight dropped into Non-League football, signing  for Stevenage Borough in 1999. Wraight spent two years at the club, before joining Chelmsford City. Wraight made a single league appearance for Chelmsford during the 2001–02 season. Wraight later played for Harlow Town.

References

English footballers
Wycombe Wanderers F.C. players
Stevenage F.C. players
Chelmsford City F.C. players
Harlow Town F.C. players
English Football League players
1979 births
Living people
Association football midfielders